Dhiggaru (Dhivehi: ދިއްގަރު) is one of the inhabited islands of Meemu Atoll.

Geography

Demography

Healthcare
Dhiggaru has a pharmacy.

Transport
The enlargement of the island's harbour was contracted to MTCC in 2015 when construction also began, completed in 2016 and inaugurated in 2018.

References

Islands of the Maldives